Bernard Daniel (born 11 August 1992) is a Vanuatuan footballer who plays as a forward for Erakor Golden Star in the Port Vila Premier League. He made his debut for the national team on November 7, 2015 in their 1–1 draw with Fiji.

References

Living people
1992 births
Association football forwards
Vanuatu international footballers
Vanuatuan footballers
Erakor Golden Star F.C. players
Vanuatu youth international footballers
Spirit 08 F.C. players